Cunedda ap Edern, also called Cunedda Wledig ( 5th century), was an important early Welsh leader, and the progenitor of the Royal dynasty of Gwynedd, one of the very oldest of western Europe.

Name 
The name Cunedda (spelled Cunedag in the AD 828 pseudo-history Historia Brittonum) derives from the Brythonic word , meaning "Good Hound/Warrior" or "Having Good Hounds/Warriors".

Early life

Cunedda's family is traced back to a grandfather living in late Roman Britain named Padarn Beisrudd. His name literally translates as Paternus of the "red tunic" or the scarlet cloak, a color attributed to Roman officers during the Roman Empire. One traditional interpretation identifies Padarn as a Roman (Romano-British) official of reasonably high rank who had been placed in command of the Votadini troops stationed in the Clackmannanshire region of Scotland in the 380s or earlier by the Roman Emperor Magnus Maximus. 

Alternatively, he may have been a frontier chieftain who was granted Roman military rank, a practice attested elsewhere along the empire's borders at the time. Possibly, Padarn's command in Scotland was assumed after his death by his son, Edern, and then passed to Edern's son, Cunedda, who would later be the founder of the Kingdom of Gwynedd and become its first King.

Genealogy 

Cunedda's genealogy, as many early Welsh Royal families, is traced back to Afallach, son of Beli Mawr, the father of King Cassivellaunus. Cassivellaunus was a pre-Roman historical figure who fought against Julius Caesar during his invasion of Britain in 54 BC, as part of the Gallic Wars, and whose name was featured on many occasions in Caesar's war diaries. 

Both Cunedda and his father-in-law, King Coel Hen (Coel Godebog), claimed descent from Beli Mawr. Early versions of their genealogies are now part of the Harleian Library, under the Harleian collections and Jesus College collections, and are one of the few direct historical sources for Welsh dynastic history in the early Middle Ages.

Life

Move to Gwynedd 

According to Old Welsh tradition contained in section 62 of the Historia Brittonum, Cunedda came from Manaw Gododdin, the modern Clackmannanshire region of Scotland:
Maelgwn, the great king, was reigning among the Britons in the region of Gwynedd, for his ancestor, Cunedag, with his sons, whose number was eight, had come previously from the northern part, that is from the region which is called Manaw Gododdin, one hundred and forty-six years before Maelgwn reigned. And with great slaughter they drove out from those regions the Scotti who never returned again to inhabit them.

Cunedda and his forebears led the Votadini against Pictish and Irish incursions south of Hadrian's Wall. Sometime after this, the Votadini troops under Cunedda relocated to North Wales to defend the region from Irish invasion, specifically the Uí Liatháin, as mentioned in the Historia Brittonum. Cunedda established himself in Wales, in the territory of the Venedoti, which would become the centre of the kingdom of Gwynedd. Two explanations for these actions have been suggested: either Cunedda was acting under the orders of Magnus Maximus (or Maximus's successors) or Vortigern, the high king of the British in the immediate post-Roman era. The range of dates (suggested by Peter Bartrum) runs from the late 370s, which would favour Maximus, to the late 440s, which would favour Vortigern.

The suggestion that Cunedda was operating under instructions from Rome has been challenged by several historians. David Dumville dismisses the whole concept of transplanting foederati from Scotland to Wales in this manner, given that the political state of sub-Roman Britain would probably have made it impossible to exercise such centralised control by the 5th century. As Maximus himself was dead by the end of 388, and Constantine III departed from Britain with the last of Rome's military forces in 407, less than a generation later, it is doubtful that Rome had much direct influence over the military actions of the Votadini, either through Maximus or any other emissary, for any significant length of time.

Maximus (or his successors) may have handed over control of the British frontiers to local chieftains at an earlier date; with the evacuation of the fort at Chester (which Mike Ashley, incidentally, argues is most likely where Cunedda established his initial base in the region, some years later) in the 370s, he may have had little option. Given that the archaeological record demonstrates Irish settlement on the Llŷn Peninsula however and possible raids as far west as Wroxeter by the late 4th century, it is difficult to conceive of either Roman or allied British forces having presented an effective defence in Wales.

Academics such as Sheppard Frere have argued that it may have been Vortigern who, adopting elements of Roman statecraft, moved the Votadini south, just as he invited Saxon settlers to protect other parts of the island. According to this version of events, Vortigern would have instructed Cunedda and his Votadini subjects to move to Wales in response to the aforementioned Irish incursions no later than the year 442, when Vortigern's former Saxon allies rebelled against his rule.

Life and succession 

Of Cunedda personally even less is known. Probably celebrated for his strength, courage, and ability to rally the beleaguered Romano-British forces of the region, he eventually secured a politically advantageous marriage to Gwawl, daughter of King Coel Hen, the Romano-British ruler of Eboracum (modern York) appointed by Magnus Maximus, and is claimed to have had nine sons. The early kingdoms of Ceredigion and Meirionnydd were supposedly named after his two sons King Ceredig and King Meirion.

Cunedda's supposed great-grandson Maelgwn Gwynedd was a contemporary of Gildas, and according to the Annales Cambriae died in 547. The reliability of early Welsh genealogies is not uncontested however, and many of the claims regarding the number and identity of Cunedda's heirs did not surface until as late as the 10th century. Nonetheless, if we accept this information as valid, calculating back from this date suggests the mid-5th-century interpretation.

Allt Cunedda
There is a hill called Allt Cunedda, close to Cydweli in Carmarthenshire, in southwest Wales. A local folk story, recorded by Victorian antiquarians, claims that Cunedda and his sons attempted to invade Cydweli, but was defeated and killed by rebellious locals and was buried in the Allt Cunedda. That would suggest that his campaigns against the Irish extended from Gwynedd into southwest Wales; this is unlikely as there was significant long-term Irish presence in the Dyfed and Ystrad Tywi areas in the fifth and sixth centuries. 

Much of the archaeological evidence from Allt Cunedda was destroyed by John Fenton's amateur and ill-recorded excavations in 1851, and more by John William Watson Stephens' dig in the 1930s. These excavations did reveal a hill fort, probably pre-Roman, the broken head of a stone hammer axe, and several collapsed stone cists containing the well-preserved skeletons of several men with formidable physical proportions. At least one of these was found in the "seated position" and another buried beneath a massive stone "shield" who had apparently been killed by a head wound. The bones are lost; Fenton sent them to an institution in London, and Stephens' long searches for them were unsuccessful. One of the tumuli was known locally as Banc Benisel and was reputedly the grave of a Sawyl Penuchel, a legendary King of the Britons presumably from late Iron Age Britain. His epithet Penuchel or Ben Uchel means "high head" perhaps on account of his height.  According to the Welsh Life of Saint Cadoc, a king named Sawyl Penuchel held court at Allt Cunedda. Confusingly, Geoffrey of Monmouth, in his Historia Regum Britanniae (1136), uses the name Samuil Penessil for a legendary pre-Roman king of Britain, preceded by Redechius and succeeded by Pir. Whether this is the same king and Cadoc's tale is just revisiting an old folk memory, a different man of the same name, or simply an error by the composer of the Life, is unclear.

Immediate family

Immediate ancestors
Eternus (Edeyrn) father, Commander of the Votadini troops
Paternus (Padarn Beisrudd, of the red robe) grandfather, Commander of the Votadini troops
Tacitus (Tegid) great-grandfather

Children
Rhufon, Ruler of the Kingdom of Rhufoniog
Dunod, Ruler of the Kingdom of Dunoding
Ceredig, King of the Kingdom of Ceredigion, grandfather of Bishop Saint David
Einion, Ruler of Gwynedd, grandfather of King Cadwallon Lawhir ap Einion
Dogfael, King of the petty Kingdom of Dogfeiling
Edern, Ruler of the minor Kingdom of Edeirnion under Gwynedd
 As well as Tybion, Ysfael and Afloeg.

Great-grandson
Maelgwn Gwynedd, King of Gwynedd, referred by Gildas as Maelgwn the Dragon or Dragon of the Island, and was the ancestor of King Cadwaladr who bore the Red Dragon.

This heraldic symbol would later be brought to England by the House of Tudor, descendants of Cunedda, through Owen Tudor and King Henry Tudor, and be featured on the Flag of Wales.

See also
Kings of Wales family trees

References

 Bartrum, Peter, A Welsh Classical Dictionary, National Library of Wales, 1993, pp. 172–173.
 J. Fenton, "The Grave of Sawyl Benisel, King of the Britons", Archaeol. Camb., vol 2, (1851) new ser, pp. 159–62.

 — English translation
 — in Latin

Footnotes

.
Monarchs of Gwynedd
Britons of the North
British traditional history
 01
People from Gwynedd
Welsh royalty
5th-century Welsh monarchs